Halocypridina is a suborder of seed shrimp in the order Halocyprida. Ostracods of this group often have a dorsoposterior spine on the carapace. The adductor muscle scars show various patterns, in contrast to those of the Cladocopina, which are in a triangular pattern (three scars) or a half-rosette (15 scars). A sixth limb is present (absent in Cladocopina). The group is divided into the Halocypridae and the Thaumatocyprididae.

References

Halocyprida
Arthropod suborders